VVB has more meanings:
 vvb is a Canadian brand owned by alizone
 Vereinsbank Victoria Bauspar
 Vorstenlandsche Voetbal Bond 
 Vlaamse Volksbeweging
 Vereinigungen Volkseigener Betriebe